North Side SC is a football club based in George Town, Cayman Islands, which currently plays in the Cayman Islands League First Division after being relegated from the Premier League in 2014. Its home stadium is the 2,500-capacity T.E. McField Sports Centre.

References

Football clubs in the Cayman Islands
Association football clubs established in 1980
1980 establishments in the Cayman Islands